Carmel College is a Catholic secondary school for girls located in Milford on Auckland's North Shore. It was established by the Sisters of Mercy in 1957 starting with a student roll of only 15 girls. The College's brother school is nearby Rosmini College.

Location
Carmel College is situated on the northern shore of Lake Pupuke.

History
In 1957, the long-held dream of the Sisters of Mercy to establish a Catholic girls' school on the North Shore was realised. Carmel College is the Mercy Charism at the heart or centre of the school.

Sister Mary Justine Gillies was given the mission of founding Carmel College on donated land, initially with 15 students and no actual classrooms. Sister Justine gathered dedicated teaching Sisters and, as the school grew, these Sisters were joined by the first full-time lay teacher, Verena Butler, in 1963.

Under Sister Pauline Engel, the third principal of the College, who was appointed in 1983, the college undertook an extensive programme of building, expanding and refurbishing. This included building a gymnasium, a food and technology block, an arts block, and the refurbishment of the science laboratories.

On 19 June 2013, Bishop Patrick Dunn and the mayor of Auckland, Len Brown, opened the Harkins Building, which included a classroom block to accommodate music, drama, information technology and social sciences, a performing arts centre seating 160, a large covered atrium providing break-out teaching and social spaces, and a new library overlooking Lake Pupuke.

Carmel celebrated its 50th jubilee in June 2007 with a reunion of many Carmel old girls, in celebrations lasting a week including songs by various music groups, a wall of photographic remembrance, and a time capsule to be dug up at the college's centennial.

School activities
Carmel College students take part in a range of activities throughout New Zealand including Stage Challenge, Big Sing Choral Festival and Polyfest. The school has a number of clubs, including the Human Rights Group, Creative Writers' Club, Students Against Driving Drunk (SADD), Young Vinnies and the SAVE environmental group.

Notable alumnae 

 Tania Dalton, netballer
 Rebecca Dubber, swimmer, Paralympic bronze medallist
 Teneale Hatton, canoer
 Fiona McDonald, singer
 Shai Navot, leader of The Opportunities Party, lawyer, crown prosecutor
 Randa, AKA LarzRanda rapper & recording artist
 Jodie Rimmer, actress

References

External links
Carmel College Website
NZ Government Education Website

Educational institutions established in 1957
Girls' schools in New Zealand
North Shore, New Zealand
Catholic secondary schools in Auckland
1957 establishments in New Zealand
Sisters of Mercy schools
Alliance of Girls' Schools Australasia